Buranovo is a village in Kocherinovo Municipality, Kyustendil Province, south-western Bulgaria. As of 2013 it has 152 inhabitants. It is situated close to the right bank of the Struma River just south of the village of Borovets, at some 2 km to the north-west of the municipal centre Kocherinovo. 

At the outbreak of the First Balkan War in 1912 two people from Buranovo joined the Macedonian-Adrianopolitan Volunteer Corps that was formed in support the Bulgarian war effort against the Ottoman Empire.

Citations

References 
 

Villages in Kyustendil Province